Oxyelophila puralis is a moth in the family Crambidae. It was described by Schaus in 1912. It is found in Costa Rica and Honduras.

References

Acentropinae
Moths described in 1912